The SpeedyCash.com 220 is an annual NASCAR Camping World Truck Series race held at the Texas Motor Speedway near Fort Worth, Texas.

The race was previously a standalone race in the month of June for the Truck Series at the track, but it shared a weekend with the track's IndyCar Series race, the Genesys 600. However, in 2021, the Cup and Xfinity Series' spring race weekend at Texas, usually in late March or early-to-mid-April, was removed from the schedule and both series joined the Truck Series on the June weekend. The Cup Series race would now be their All-Star Race, which was previously held at Charlotte Motor Speedway. The distance was also shortened from 250.5 miles (403.14 km) to 220.5 miles in 2021, and the race name was changed to reflect the miles (which is the case for most NASCAR races) instead of the kilometers.

Past winners

Notes
2006–2008, 2010–2011, 2020 and 2022: The race was extended due to a NASCAR Overtime finish.
2020: Race postponed from June 5 to October 25 due to the COVID-19 pandemic.

Multiple winners (drivers)

Multiple winners (teams)

Manufacturer wins

References

External links
 

1997 establishments in Texas
 
NASCAR Truck Series races
Recurring sporting events established in 1997
Annual sporting events in the United States